WOSC-CD (channel 61) is a Class A low-power television station in Pittsburgh, Pennsylvania, United States. The station is owned by The Videohouse, Inc. WOSC-CD primarily broadcasts national digital multicast networks.

The station went on the air as W61CC in 1997. By 1999, it was airing the America's Store home shopping service. The station switched to airing HSN in 2004 when America's Store moved to WQEX (channel 16).

Local programming 
As of the first quarter of 2020, WOSC cut away from national programming for five hours each week, primarily on Sunday, to meet its local programming requirements as a Class A station. Most of their local programming was Saint Simon & Jude Parish services, which aired from 7:30 AM – 8:30 AM. WOSC also aired Cappelli & Company from 8:30 AM – 9:30 AM. Saint Simon & Jude Parish would then continue from 9:30 AM – 12:30 PM.g.

On July 12, 2022, WOSC-CD added an over-the-air broadcast variant of One America News Network known as OAN Plus to its list of digital subchannels.

Subchannels 
The station's digital channel is multiplexed:

References

External links 
 

Television stations in Pittsburgh
Movies! affiliates
Decades (TV network) affiliates
Twist (TV network) affiliates
Buzzr affiliates
Television channels and stations established in 1997
1997 establishments in Pennsylvania
Low-power television stations in the United States